astalavista.box.sk was founded in 1994 as one of the first search engines for computer security information. In practice it turned out to be used as a search engine for security exploits, software for hacking, cracking and different keygenerators and software cracks.  The site is also known for referencing things such as spyware and viruses and because of this the website is known to possibly contain data, links, downloadable files, and information some users would consider spyware, adware, or other unwanted programs.  Astalavista.box.sk is hosted in Slovakia. Astalavista is a pun on the Spanish phrase "hasta la vista" (meaning "see you later") and the 90's web search engine Altavista. (Doub: Note that Altavista is from 1995 and Astalavista from 1994).

Astalavista is also used to refer to another computer security related website such as the Astalavista Security Group.

References

External links

Computing websites
Internet search engines
Computer security software